Here I Am Again is the twenty-first solo studio album by American country music singer-songwriter Loretta Lynn. It was released on October 2, 1972, by Decca Records. The album features liner notes written by Lynn's mother, Clara Butcher, who had remarried following the death of Lynn's father, Ted Webb, in 1959. This would be Lynn's last studio album to be released under Decca Records, which would merge with MCA in 1973.

Critical reception 

In the October 21, 1972 issue, Billboard published a review of the album that said, "One of the decided queens of country music, Miss Loretta Lynn, offers "Manhattan Kansas", "Delta Dawn", and "The Best Years
of My Life" as well as the title tune of Here I Am Again. A superb LP that warrants repeated airplay on country stations."

Cashbox published a review in the October 14, 1972 issue that said, "She's been here before, and she'll be back many times to follow. When Loretta says "here I am again" with a new eleven song collection, her return is welcome. She is one of the cornerstones of country music, and although her face is more than familiar to country aficionados, her music is always fresh and exciting – it never becomes repetitive or unreal. For this reason, Loretta has stayed on top of the scene and can say that she's here again with more new music. Includes "My Kind of Man", "Where Do Babies Go" and the title tune.

Allmusic rated the album three out of five stars, calling a couple of the songs on this album "sassy", including "A Woman a Day".

Commercial performance 
The album peaked at No. 4 on the US Billboard Hot Country LP's chart.

The album's only single, "Here I Am Again", peaked at No. 3 on the US Billboard Hot Country Singles chart. The single also peaked at No. 3 in Canada on the RPM Country Singles chart.

Recording 
Recording sessions for the album began on April 25 and 26, 1972, at Bradley's Barn in Mount Juliet, Tennessee. Two additional sessions followed on May 3 and August 9. Two songs on the album were recorded during the sessions for 1972's One's on the Way. "A Woman a Day" was recorded on January 18, 1972, and "I Miss You More Today" was recorded on January 20, 1972.

Track listing

Personnel
Adapted from the album liner notes and Decca recording session records.
Willie Ackerman – drums
Larry Barbier – photography
Harold Bradley – bass guitar
Owen Bradley – producer
Clara Butcher – liner notes
James Capps – acoustic guitar
Ray Edenton – acoustic guitar
Buddy Harman – drums
The Jordanaires – background vocals
Loretta Lynn – lead vocals
Grady Martin – guitar
Bob Moore – bass
Hargus Robbins – piano
Hal Rugg – steel guitar, dobro

Charts 
Album

Singles

References 

1972 albums
Loretta Lynn albums
Albums produced by Owen Bradley
Decca Records albums